Al Bayda (not to be mixed with Al-Bayda' in Al-Jawf, the ancient Nashaq), also transliterated as Baida, Al-Baidhah or Beida, is a town in the Governorate of Al-Bayda' in Yemen.

It is located  SE of San'a'. Rada' is the present capital of the Governorate of Al Bayda'.

History

It is the historical capital of the Beda Sultanate from 1636 until 1930.

On 8 October 2014, at least nine people have been killed in an attack by Al-Qaeda militants on security and government buildings in the town, officials say. The official Saba news agency said car bombs were used in the dawn assault which was repelled.

In July 2021, al-Bayda was the site of intense fighting between Yemeni government-backed forces (aided by ally Saudi-Arabia), on the one side, and Houthi fighters, on the other.

Population
Its population, according to the 2011 Yemeni census, was 29,853.

Climate

References

External links
 Map of Yemen, showing Al Beyda's location
 Information about Al Bayda'

Populated places in Al Bayda Governorate